Bob and Mike Bryan were the two-time defending champions, but lost in the final to Oliver Marach and Fabrice Martin, 6–3, 6–7(7–9), [11–13].

Seeds

Draw

Draw

References
 Main Draw

Delray Beach International Tennis Championships - Doubles
2016 Doubles
2016 Delray Beach International Tennis Championships